Dongnanjiao Island("东南礁") is located in the northeast corner of Zhoushanqundao (Zhoushan Islands),76 km from Shengsi County, and is part of the Shengsi County of Zhoushan city. Dongnanjiao is the baseline point of the Chinese territorial sea.

Notes and references

See also
Zhoushanqundao (舟山群岛)
Suyanjiao (Suyan Rock) (苏岩礁)
Sheshandao(佘山岛)
Liangxiongdiyu(两兄弟屿)
Yushanliedao(渔山列岛)

External links
 Declaration of the Government of the People's Republic of China on the baselines of the territorial sea(May15th, 1996)
中国东海１０座领海基点石碑建成
中华人民共和国政府关于中华人民共和国领海基线的声明(1996年5月15日)

Islands of Zhejiang
Baselines of the Chinese territorial sea